The United Nations building may refer to one of the following:
 Headquarters of the United Nations, in New York City
 United Nations Secretariat Building, the flagship structure in that building
 Palace of Nations
 United Nations Office at Geneva
 United Nations Office at Nairobi
 United Nations Office at Vienna